Daniel Bernard D.D. (died 1588) was an English Church of England clergyman and scholar.

Bernard was based at Christ Church, Oxford. He was Canon of Christ Church Cathedral, Oxford from 1577. He received his Doctor of Divinity degree in 1585 and was Vice-Chancellor at the University of Oxford during 1586–7.

He was the brother of the author John Bernard (died 1554?) of Queens' College, Cambridge and the divine Thomas Bernard (died 1582), also a Canon of Christ Church.

References

Year of birth missing
1588 deaths
16th-century English Anglican priests
English Christian theologians
Vice-Chancellors of the University of Oxford
Fellows of Christ Church, Oxford